P. Purushothaman (c. 1948 – 2 November 2019) was an Indian politician belonging to All India Anna Dravida Munnetra Kazhagam. He was elected twice as a legislator of the Puducherry Legislative Assembly and served as the  secretary of Puducherry All India Anna Dravida Munnetra Kazhagam.

Biography
Purushothaman was elected as a legislator of the Puducherry Legislative Assembly from Ariankuppam in 1985. After 26 years he was elected as a legislator of the Puducherry Legislative Assembly from Manavely in 2011. He was appointed the secretary of Puducherry All India Anna Dravida Munnetra Kazhagam in 2014.

Purushothaman was married to Jayalakshmi. They had one son and five daughters.

Purushothaman died on 2 November 2019 at the age of 71.

References

1940s births
2019 deaths
All India Anna Dravida Munnetra Kazhagam politicians
Puducherry MLAs 1985–1990
Puducherry MLAs 2011–2016